The orangutan is a species of great ape.

Orangutan may also refer to:
Orangutang (band), a rock band from Boston
Orangutan Opening or Sokolsky Opening, a chess opening